Farhat Mustafin (born 7 September 1950), also spelled Farkhat or Farkhad, is a Russian former wrestler of Volga Tatar descent who competed for the Soviet Union in the 1976 Summer Olympics where he won a bronze medal in Greco-Roman wrestling as a bantamweight.

He is the father of Russian artistic gymnast and Olympic Gold medalist Aliya Mustafina.

References

1950 births
Living people
Tatar people of Russia
Olympic wrestlers of the Soviet Union
Wrestlers at the 1976 Summer Olympics
Russian male sport wrestlers
Olympic bronze medalists for the Soviet Union
Olympic medalists in wrestling
Volga Tatar people
Tatar sportspeople
Medalists at the 1976 Summer Olympics